Ahmed Nabil Aly Daoud Marzouk, more commonly known as Manga (born October 3, 1991) is an Egyptian footballer who plays as a right back for Smouha.

In January 2016 he named his newborn son after Mesut Özil.

References

External links
 

1991 births
Living people
Egyptian footballers
Egypt international footballers
Association football fullbacks
Al Ahly SC players
Footballers from Cairo
Egyptian Premier League players